Krokodil Festival (Knjževno Regionalno Okupljanje Koje Otklanja Dosadu I Letargiju) is a literary festival, with the main event held annually in Belgrade, Serbia. The festival mostly presents authors from the region of former Yugoslavia (Croatia, Bosnia and Herzegovina, Slovenia, Montenegro, North Macedonia and Serbia) with exceptions like authors from Germany or Denmark. The main festival event is the Belgrade Summer Krokodil, a three-day or two-day festival held in June.

Overview
The festival was founded in 2009. Since then there were eight main festival events held in Belgrade and several one-day festivals in Pula (Croatia), Ljubljana (Slovenia), Leipzig (Germany) and Inđija (Serbia) – as part of the "Krokodil – On the Road" programme.

Festival events have been held in the locality of the Museum of Yugoslav History.

The festival is directed by Vladimir Arsenijević and Ana Pejović.

2016-2017 Association Krokodil participated in organizing the writing of the Declaration on the Common Language.

Visiting authors
The following authors have visited the festival:

2009
Lamija Begagić (text in Serbo-Croatian)

2010
Bekim Sejranović (text in Serbo-Croatian)
Bora Ćosić (text in German)
Petar Luković (text in Serbo-Croatian)
Slobodan Tišma (text in Serbo-Croatian)

2011
Clemens Meyer
Goran Vojnović
Ivana Sajko (text in Croatian)
Mirko Kovač
Predrag Lucić (text in Croatian)
Saša Ilić (text in Serbian)

2020
Lana Bastašić
Rumena Bužarovska
Monika Herceg
Lejla Kalamujić

References

External links
 Krokodil Literary Festival Belgrade official website

2009 establishments in Serbia
Recurring events established in 2009
June events
Festivals in Serbia
Literary festivals in Serbia
Serbian literature
Culture in Belgrade
Summer events in Serbia